Pasta alla Norma, earlier called pasta con le melanzane 'pasta with eggplant', is an Italian dish of pasta and eggplant. It is typical of Sicilian cuisine, from Catania in particular.

It is made of spaghetti or other pasta with tomato sauce, covered with slices of fried eggplant and served with grated ricotta salata cheese and often basil.

It was named in honor of the native of Catania Vincenzo Bellini, the composer of the opera Norma. It is said that the Italian writer Nino Martoglio exclaimed "This is a real 'Norma'!", meaning a masterpiece, when he tasted the dish, though the name is not attested until decades after his death.

Pasta alla Norma was named "dish of the year" by the  Tourism Award in 2018.

See also
 List of eggplant dishes
 List of pasta dishes

References

Cuisine of Sicily
Pasta dishes
Eggplant dishes
Catania